The Presbyterian Church in Korea (BoSuHapDong III.) was split into 2 more other segment in 1989. Among these was the Presbyterian Church in Korea (BoSuHapDong). The first moderator was Rev. Kim Dae Hyung. The Apostles Creed and Westminster Confession are the standards. In 2004 it had 19,100 members in 120 congregations and 120 ordained ministers.

References 

Presbyterian denominations in South Korea
Presbyterian denominations in Asia